The 1900 New Hampshire gubernatorial election was held on November 6, 1900. Republican nominee Chester B. Jordan defeated Democratic nominee Frederick E. Potter with 59.36% of the vote.

General election

Candidates
Major party candidates
Chester B. Jordan, Republican
Frederick E. Potter, Democratic

Other candidates
Josiah M. Fletcher, Prohibition
Sumner F. Claflin, Social Democratic

Results

References

1900
New Hampshire
Gubernatorial